Joseph Atiyeh (born October 8, 1957) is a retired Syrian wrestler and the winner of Syria's first Olympic medal.

Early life
Atiyeh was born in Amar al-Husn, Homs Governorate, Syria. His parents immigrated to Allentown, Pennsylvania when he was two years old.

Career
Atiyeh wrestled at Dieruff High School in Allentown, Pennsylvania.

In the 1984 Summer Olympics, he represented his country in the freestyle heavyweight 100 kg competition, and won a silver medal. Though Atiyeh lived most of his life in the United States, and studied at Louisiana State University, where he was on the school's wrestling team, he qualified as a dual citizen and wrestled for Syria.

Atiyeh made it to the finals against Lou Banach of the United States and lost by fall in 61 seconds. Atiyeh had wrestled Banach in 1978 at the Midlands wrestling championship in Chicago. Atiyeh wrestled for Louisiana State University and won 13-10 in his first round of the championship against Banach.

At the 1984 Olympics, Atiyeh's victories included a win over Vasile Pușcașu from Romania by fall in the first round. Puscassu went on to win the 1988 Olympic gold medal in the heavyweight category in Seoul, Korea.  Atiyeh also beat Kartar Singh of India by fall in 33 seconds.

Personal life
Atiyeh's younger brother, Dennis Atiyeh, represented Syria in the freestyle super-heavyweight category at the 1988 Summer Olympics.

References

External links
 

1957 births
Living people
Louis E. Dieruff High School alumni
Louisiana State University alumni
Medalists at the 1984 Summer Olympics
Olympic medalists in wrestling
Olympic silver medalists for Syria
Olympic wrestlers of Syria
People from Homs Governorate
Syrian Christians
Syrian emigrants to the United States
Syrian male sport wrestlers
Wrestlers at the 1984 Summer Olympics